The University Corporation for Atmospheric Research (UCAR) is a US nonprofit consortium of more than 100 colleges and universities providing research and training in the atmospheric and related sciences. UCAR manages the National Center for Atmospheric Research (NCAR) and provides additional services to strengthen and support research and education through its community programs. Its headquarters, in Boulder, Colorado, include NCAR's Mesa Laboratory, designed by I.M. Pei.

UCAR was established in 1959 by faculty from 14 leading universities to support and nourish the atmospheric sciences. They were motivated by a newly recognized need for pooled observational and computational facilities and a strong research staff, which together would allow the academic community to carry out complex, long-term scientific programs beyond the reach of individual universities.

This group’s first major action, in partnership with the National Science Foundation, was to establish NCAR. Since then, UCAR has managed NCAR on behalf of NSF to address pressing scientific and societal needs involving the atmosphere and its interactions with the oceans, land, and Sun—what is now called Earth system science.

Community programs 

UCAR’s role in supporting and complementing the work of academia has grown to include new research, service, and education efforts, including

 COMET Program - offers professional training on site and online in meteorology, weather hazards, hydrology, oceanography, emergency management, and environmental science
 COSMIC Program - supports satellite and ground-based observations and research using GPS technology for meteorology, climate, and ionospheric studies
 GLOBE Program - provides hands-on, school-based learning and collaboration with a global network of students, scientists, and educators
 Joint Office for Science Support - supports community research, conference, and field projects
 National Science Digital Library Resource Center and Digital Learning Sciences - supports and sustains community digital education projects
 Unidata Program - provides streaming observational data to university classrooms and researchers around the world
 Visiting Scientist Programs - places postdoctoral fellows and visiting scientists at partner institutions

The organization hosts numerous workshops, community meetings, and opportunities for collaboration throughout the year.

Governance and funding 

As of 2016, UCAR comprises 109 member colleges and universities and 52 international affiliates. The organization has a total of 1,390 staff, including 877 at NCAR and 282 engaged in community programs. Total expenditures for fiscal year 2015 (October 2014–September 2015) were approximately $204.2 million.

UCAR and NCAR are headquartered in Boulder, Colorado, spread across four campuses. Ancillary activities take place in Cheyenne, Wyoming, Washington, D.C., and in about 15 other states.

Walter Orr Roberts was UCAR’s first president. Antonio J. Busalacchi Jr. has been UCAR president since August 2016.

Member List
Appalachian State University
Arizona State University
Brown University
California Institute of Technology
Central Michigan University
Clemson University
Coastal Carolina University
College at Brockport
College of Charleston
Colorado State University
Columbia University
Cornell University
Dartmouth College
Drexel University
Duke University
Embry-Riddle Aeronautical University
Florida Institute of Technology
Florida State University
George Mason University
Georgia Institute of Technology
Hampton University
Harvard University
Howard University
Indiana University
Iowa State University
Jackson State University
Johns Hopkins University
Louisiana State University
Massachusetts Institute of Technology
McGill University
Metropolitan State University of Denver
Michigan State University
Michigan Technological University
Millersville University
Mississippi State University
Naval Postgraduate School
Desert Research Institute
New Mexico Institute of Mining & Technology
New York University
North Carolina A&T University
North Carolina State University
Northern Vermont University-Lyndon
Old Dominion University
Oregon State University
Pennsylvania State University
Plymouth State University
Princeton University
Purdue University
Rice University
Rutgers University
San Diego State University
St. Cloud State University
Saint Louis University
San Francisco State University
San José State University
Scripps Institute, University of California, San Diego
South Dakota School of Mines & Technology
Stanford University
University at Albany
SUNY Oswego
Stony Brook University
Texas A&M University
Texas A&M University, Corpus Christi
Texas State University
Texas Tech University
United States Naval Academy
Universidad Metropolitana
University of Alabama
University of Alabama in Huntsville
University of Alaska, Fairbanks
University of Arizona
University of British Columbia
University of California, Berkeley
University of California, Davis
University of California, Irvine
University of California, Los Angeles
University of Chicago
University of Colorado
University of Connecticut
University of Delaware
University of Denver
University of Georgia
University of Hawaiʻi at Mānoa
University of Houston
University of Illinois at Urbana-Champaign
University of Iowa
University of Kansas
University of Louisiana at Monroe
University of Maine
University of Maryland, Baltimore County
University of Maryland, College Park
University of Massachusetts Amherst
University of Massachusetts Lowell
University of Miami
University of Michigan
University of Minnesota, Twin Cities
University of Missouri
University of Nebraska-Lincoln
University of New Hampshire
University of North Carolina at Asheville
University of North Dakota
University of Northern Colorado
University of Oklahoma
University of Rhode Island
University of Saskatchewan
University of Texas at Arlington
University of Texas at Austin
University of Texas at El Paso
University of Toronto
University of Utah
University of Virginia
University of Washington
University of Wisconsin-Madison
University of Wisconsin-Milwaukee
University of Wyoming
Utah State University
Valparaiso University
Washington State University
Western Illinois University
Woods Hole Oceanographic Institution
Yale University
York University

UCAR Presidents 

A list of all UCAR presidents is given below.

In addition to NSF sponsorship, funding includes grants from and contracts with the National Oceanic and Atmospheric Administration (NOAA), National Aeronautics and Space Administration (NASA), the Department of Defense (DOD), Federal Aviation Administration (FAA), Department of Energy (DOE), Environmental Protection Agency (EPA), and other agencies and organizations.

References

External links 
 
 National Center for Atmospheric Research (NCAR)

Meteorology and climate education
Meteorological research institutes